Mark James Williams  (born 21 March 1975) is a Welsh professional snooker player who is a three-time World Champion, winning in 2000, 2003 and 2018. Often noted for his single-ball long potting ability, Williams has earned the nickname "The Welsh Potting Machine".

Williams turned professional in 1992 and has been ranked the world number one player three times (1999–00, 2000–01 and 2002–03). His most successful season to date was 2002–03, when he won the Triple Crown: the UK Championship, the Masters and the World Championship. In doing so, he became only the third player, after Steve Davis and Stephen Hendry, to win all three Triple Crown events in one season. He is the first player (and to date, the only player) to win all three versions of the professional World Championship: the World Snooker Championship, the Six-red World Championship and the World Seniors Championship.

The first left-handed player to win the World Championship, Williams has won 24 ranking tournaments, including two UK Championships (1999 and 2002), making him fifth on the all-time list. He has also won the Masters on two occasions (1998 and 2003). His form began to decline after his second World Championship title in 2003; he then dropped out of the top 16 following the 2007–08 season, but he regained his place for 2009–10. Williams has compiled over 580 century breaks in professional competition, including three maximum breaks. He became the oldest player to make a maximum break in professional competition when he compiled a 147 at the 2022 English Open, aged 47 years and 270 days.

Career

Early career
Williams was born in Cwm, near Ebbw Vale, in the Welsh county of Gwent (now the county borough of Blaenau Gwent). He started playing snooker at an early age and won his first junior event when he was eleven years old; it was then that he realised that he wanted to pursue a career as a snooker player. He scored his first century break when he was thirteen, and had achieved his first 147 break by the time he was eighteen. As a schoolboy, he was also a promising amateur boxer, remaining undefeated in twelve fights. He was encouraged to play snooker by his father Dilwyn, who was a coal miner. At the age of fifteen, Mark did a 12-hour shift down the mines.

Williams finished his first season ranked 119th; three years later, he was ranked in the world's top 16 for the 1996–97 season. His first ranking tournament win came in January 1996, when he won the 1996 Welsh Open title, beating John Parrott 9–3 in the final. After failing to qualify for the 1996 World Championship, he won the first ranking event of the new season in October 1996, the Grand Prix, beating surprise finalist Euan Henderson 9–5. In April 1997, he went on to win the British Open, beating Stephen Hendry 9–2 in the final. He also beat Hendry in a "thrilling" final in February 1998, to take his first Masters title, winning 10–9 in a black-ball finish in the deciding frame, after recovering from 6–9 down. At the 1997 World Championship, he was drawn against his coach Terry Griffiths, who was making his last appearance at the Crucible as a player; Williams eventually beat Griffiths 10–9 on the black, but then lost 8–13 to Hendry in the last 16. He reached the semi-finals of the 1998 World Championship, losing 14–17 to Ken Doherty. The following year, at the 1999 World Championship, he made it through to the final and finished the tournament as runner-up to Hendry.

1999–2004
The 1999–00 season was a very successful one for Williams who won the 1999 UK Championship and the World Championship. These results, along with another ranking title and three runner-up positions, allowed him to capture the world number one position for the first time. In the World Championship final he came from 7–13 behind his fellow countryman Matthew Stevens to eventually win 18–16. He also produced a notable comeback in his semi-final match against John Higgins, coming from 10 to 14 down to win 17–15. Williams won only one ranking event in the following season, the Grand Prix, with a 9–5 victory over Ronnie O'Sullivan in the final, but he was a runner-up in two other ranking events, the 2000 UK Championship and the China Open. This was enough to retain his number one ranking, although his title defence at the World Championship fell in the second round with a 12–13 defeat to Joe Swail.

In the 2001–02 season, Williams also only won one ranking tournament, as he struggled to find the form from the previous season, winning the China Open, where he defeated Anthony Hamilton 9–8 from 5–8 down in the final. However, he lost to the same player 9–13 in the second round of the World Championship and the number one ranking to Ronnie O'Sullivan.

Another strong performance came in the 2002–03 season when he won the 2002 UK Championship, Masters and World Championship titles. This made him only the fourth player after Hendry, Davis and John Higgins to hold these titles simultaneously, and only the third player after Davis and Hendry to have won them all in one season. These results enabled him to reclaim the number one spot at the end of the season. In the UK Championship final he beat Ken Doherty 10–9, and in the Masters he beat Hendry 10–4. Before the 2003 World Championship he had a scare with his cue when it was damaged and badly bent on his flight with Ryanair to play in the Irish Masters, but he had it repaired before the tournament.

On his way to winning the 2003 World title, he had a relatively untroubled route to the final with wins over Stuart Pettman 10–2, Quinten Hann 13–2, Hendry 13–7 and Stephen Lee 17–8 before facing Doherty in the final. He led 10–2, and looked to be heading for an easy victory, before Doherty fought back to 16–16. Williams regained his composure under intense pressure to win the last two frames and lift the trophy for the second time.

The following season, he lost in the first round of the 2003 UK Championship to Fergal O'Brien, a match which ended his record run of 48 tournaments in which he had won his first match. His defence at the 2004 World Championship started with a 10–7 win over Dominic Dale, but he lost 11–13 in the second round to Joe Perry, and he endured a run of poor form over the 2004–05 season, dropping to ninth in the world rankings for the 2005–06 season.

2005–2009
On 20 April, in 2005 he became the first Welshman, and the fifth player in history, to score a maximum break at the Crucible Theatre in the World Championship. This came in the final frame of a 10–1 first round victory over Robert Milkins, but he lost in the second round to Ian McCulloch 12–13.

On 26 March 2006, Williams won his 16th ranking event (and his first in two and a half years), the China Open in Beijing, beating Higgins 9–8 in the final. This helped him return to the top eight in the world rankings, after a dramatic fall in the provisional rankings which saw him facing a possible drop out of the top 16. He also showed good form in the 2006 World Championship, beating Anthony Hamilton 10–1 and Mark Selby 13–8 to set up a quarter-final clash with Ronnie O'Sullivan, the first time the two had met at the Crucible. The match was given extra tension considering they had been rivals (although O'Sullivan has since said that the former feud has been replaced by friendship and respect). In a close-fought match, O'Sullivan eventually won 13–11. It was revealed during that tournament that Williams had split with coach Terry Griffiths. The two remained very close friends, but Griffiths would no longer be coaching him. In late 2007, Williams returned to having Griffiths as his coach.

On 2 September 2006, Williams won the Pot Black trophy, after compiling a century break (119) in the final against John Higgins. However, Williams had perhaps the worst season of his career in 2006–07, losing his first match in a string of tournaments (including the World Championship, for the first time ever), but he retained his top 16 place, mainly through the ranking points he had earned the previous season.

His first win of the 2007–08 season came in the Grand Prix with a 4–3 win over Ian McCulloch, but he still failed to qualify for the last 16 of the event and was outside the top 32 on the provisional ranking list.

In the 2007 UK Championship, he showed a return to some form. He beat Ricky Walden comfortably 9–3 in the last 32, and in the last 16 he faced Mark Allen who led 4–0 and 5–1. However, a cool comeback saw him win the remaining eight frames to win 9–5. In the quarter-finals, Stephen Maguire was too strong and beat him 9–5.

After a 2–6 first round loss to Ken Doherty in the Masters, Williams revealed he was considering retirement from the game if he dropped out of the top 32 and was forced to play in all the qualifying competitions, although then only 32 years old. But he also claimed at the Welsh Open at Newport that this statement had been blown out of proportion, and that he would remain a professional. He began to show more consistency for the remainder of the season, reaching the last 16 of three ranking events and a run to the quarter-finals of the China Open, but he could not reach his first semi-final for two years, losing 3–5 to Ryan Day. At the World Championship he defeated Mark Davis; however, a 7–13 defeat to Ronnie O'Sullivan in the second round forced him out of the top 16, pushing him into the qualifiers for 2008/2009. In that match he was on the receiving end of a 147 break from O'Sullivan. On 8 July 2008 it was announced that Williams had split from his management company 110 Sport, following O'Sullivan and Stephen Maguire.

In the 2008–09 season, he reached the quarter-finals of the Shanghai Masters and UK Championship, but also suffered three qualifying defeats. The 2008 UK Championship particularly saw some return to form as he beat Mark Selby and Graeme Dott 9–7, before losing narrowly 8–9 to Ali Carter. He also qualified for the World Championship but lost 7–10 to Stephen Hendry after leading 7–5. During the end of the match he suffered some trouble with his tip. However, he had done enough to return to the top 16 at the end of the season.

2009–10 season
The 2009–10 season started badly when Williams broke his wrist in a fall at home, less than a month before the Shanghai Masters, the first ranking event of the season. He played in Shanghai despite the injury, but wore a cast on his wrist because its removal could have caused long-term damage. There he won his first round match against Joe Swail 5–3, but lost in the next round against John Higgins 1–5. In the Grand Prix he secured wins over Stuart Bingham, Stephen Hendry and Robert Milkins on his way to the semi-finals. Despite racking up a 142 (the highest break of the tournament) in the first frame against Ding Junhui, he lost 1–6.

In the 2009 UK Championship he led Graeme Dott 6–2, before Dott retired due to illness and Williams thus won the match 9–2. After this he lost his next match against Peter Lines 8–9. At the Masters he won his wild card round match, beating Rory McLeod 6–2. Then he won his first round match against Ali Carter 6–3 to progress to the quarter-finals of the event, despite being involved in a traffic accident the day before his match against Carter. It was reported that a car drove into the back of the 4×4 that his sponsors had lent him, which was carrying Williams and Hendry to a restaurant. In the quarter-finals he defeated Shaun Murphy 6–4, but eventually lost a high-quality match in the semi-finals 5–6 against Ronnie O'Sullivan. In the Welsh Open, he reached the quarter-finals, beating Fergal O'Brien 5–2 and Andrew Higginson 5–0, before losing against Stephen Maguire 1–5.

After these signs of form, in April 2010 he won his first ranking tournament in four years – the China Open. On his way he beat Jamie Cope 5–3, the then reigning world champion John Higgins 5–2, Marco Fu 5–1, and Ali Carter 6–4, setting up a clash with Ding Junhui in the final. Trailing 3–5 at one stage, Williams eventually won the match 10–6. This was his 17th ranking event win and his third China Open. After his victory, Williams said: "I'm over the moon to win again. It's been a long time coming but I've kept working hard and I felt that in the end the results would come."

In the World Snooker Championship, Williams defeated Marcus Campbell 10–5 in the first round, but lost his second-round match against O'Sullivan 10–13. He finished the season ranked eighth.

2010–11 season
Williams opened the season by winning the first event of the Players Tour Championship by defeating Stephen Maguire 4–0 in the final, a new addition to the snooker calendar introduced by Barry Hearn, a series of events that Williams has supported. Williams finished 6th on the Players Tour Championship Order of Merit.

In the Shanghai Masters Williams won his first round match against Ricky Walden 5–3, but lost narrowly in the second round against Graeme Dott 4–5. He then reached the semi-finals of the World Open, where he lost 2–3 against eventual winner Neil Robertson.

He was selected to compete in the 2010 Premier League, due to his success from the previous season, the first time he has competed in the event for five years, but failed to reach the semi-finals. At the 2010 UK Championship he reached the final, his run including a 9–8 victory over Shaun Murphy after trailing 6–8, but lost against John Higgins 9–10 in the final, after leading 7–2, 8–4 and 9–5 at some points of the match, as well as leading the 17th frame by 29 points with only the colours remaining, meaning Higgins needed a snooker to stay in the match. Williams' next tournament was the Masters, where he lost 4–6 in the first round against Ding Junhui. Williams won the first ranking event of 2011, the German Masters, by defeating Mark Selby 9–7 in the final. At the China Open Williams lost in the first round 4–5 against Stephen Lee, despite making four centuries.

At the 2011 World Snooker Championship, Williams defeated Ryan Day 10–5 in the first round, and Jamie Cope 13–4 in the second round. He then won his quarter-final against Mark Allen 13–5, and in doing so he reached the semi-final stage for the first time since 2003, but lost 14–17 against John Higgins. As a result of Selby's exit from the tournament Williams became the new world number one after the event.

2011–12 season
At the World Cup Williams was partnered with Matthew Stevens to represent Wales, and they reached the semi-finals, losing 1–4 against China. Williams then reached the final of the Australian Goldfields Open, but lost 8–9 against Stuart Bingham, after leading 8–5 at one point of the match. Williams also lost from a winning position in the final of the next major ranking event, the Shanghai Masters. His run included a 6–5 win over Neil Robertson in the semi-final, and he led Mark Selby 9–7 in the final, but lost the last three frames to lose 9–10. The defeat also meant that Selby took the world number one spot from Williams. He was beaten in the last 16 of the 2011 UK Championship by Ricky Walden and reached the quarter-finals in his defence of the German Masters, where he succumbed 3–5 to Stephen Lee. Williams suffered a 1–5 defeat to Mark King in the first round of the World Open and by the same scoreline to Ronnie O'Sullivan in the second round of the China Open.

Williams played in 11 of the 12 PTC events throughout the season, but could only reach the last 32 two times, in Event 10 and Event 11. He was ranked 82nd in the PTC Order of Merit, comfortably outside the top 24 who made the Finals.

Williams caused a degree of controversy ahead of the World Championship by stating on his Twitter page that he "hates" the tournament's venue, the Crucible Theatre, and hopes it will be played in China soon. He also swore when describing the Grade II listed building. A spokesman from the WPBSA confirmed a statement would be released regarding the matter. Williams was drawn to play Liu Chuang in the first round and won 10–6 to set up a second round clash with O'Sullivan which he lost 6–13. The result meant that Williams has failed to beat O'Sullivan in over 10 years in ranking events. Williams ended the season ranked world number 3. It was revealed by World Snooker that Williams had been fined a total of £4,000 for his comments made before the World Championship.

2012–13 season

Williams first ranking event of the 2012–13 season was the Wuxi Classic, where he beat Tom Ford and Mark Allen, before losing 3–5 to Marcus Campbell in the quarter-finals. He went one better at the Shanghai Masters by seeing off Mark Davis, Ricky Walden and Joe Perry to face Judd Trump in the semi-finals. Trump was 5–1 up and on a break of 53 for the match, but Williams came back to trail 4–5 before losing the next frame to come up short of completing a comeback, and Trump beat Williams 6–4. Williams then suffered a huge dip in form as he lost in the first round of six successive ranking events; after his defeat to Mark King in the 2012 UK Championship he suggested that he was contemplating retirement. 

During his string of defeats he did beat Matthew Stevens in the non-ranking Masters from 1–4 down (Stevens also missed a pot for 5–1), but then lost 1–6 to eventual champion Mark Selby. At the China Open in March Williams won his first match in a ranking event since September with a 5–2 victory against Lü Haotian and continued his run by defeating Ali Carter 5–4, before losing 1–5 to Selby in the quarter-finals. At the World Championship he lost 6–10 to debuting compatriot Michael White in the first round and admitted afterwards that the season had been one he would be looking forward to forgetting, but he was committed to playing next year. His poor season saw him drop 12 places in the rankings to world number 15.

2013–14 season

In July 2013 he won the Rotterdam Open, defeating Mark Selby 4–3 in the final. This was Williams' second title in a Players Tour Championship event. However, he had a poor season in the ranking events as he failed to reach a single quarter-final for the first time since the 2006–07 season. He did earn an encouraging 4–3 win over world number one Neil Robertson at the Welsh Open; Williams said afterwards that he was glad he had ignored his friend Stephen Hendry's advice to retire and believed he still had ranking event titles left in him. He had chances to move 3–0 ahead in the last 16 against Marco Fu, but eventually lost 2–4; afterwards he said that the Williams who won two world titles over 10 years ago was "dead". In the qualifying rounds for the World Championship, Williams lost 8–10 to Alan McManus, meaning he was absent from the tournament for the first time since 1996. Williams finished the campaign as the world number 18, the first time he had ended the season outside the top 16 in six years.

2014–15 season

Williams lost in the second round of his first two ranking events of the 2014–15 season. His first quarter-final of the campaign was at the International Championship and he trailed Ronnie O'Sullivan 0–3, before winning five successive frames with a high break of 120. The match went into a deciding frame, which Williams won to beat the five-time world champion for the first time in 12 years. His semi-final match against Mark Allen also went all the way, after Williams had been 4–7 down, and a miss on the final red proved crucial as he was defeated 8–9. He was beaten 2–6 by Stephen Maguire in the third round of the 2014 UK Championship.

After knocking out Judd Trump 4–1 to reach the quarter-finals of the Welsh Open, Williams said that he no was longer expecting to win tournaments and was more concerned with improving his ranking. He then made two centuries in defeating Marco Fu 5–1 to play in the semi-finals of the event for the first time since 2003. Williams took advantage of Ben Woollaston missing chances to send their match into a deciding frame after he had been 3–5 behind, but lost it to just fall short of reaching the final in his home tournament. Williams won through to the final of the minor-ranking Gdynia Open, but was whitewashed 4–0 by Neil Robertson. Despite only being 39 years old, Williams took part in the World Seniors Championship as he would turn 40 before the end of the season and he won the title by beating Fergal O'Brien 2–1. Another ranking event semi-final followed at the Indian Open, where he lost 2–4 to Michael White.

After defeating Thepchaiya Un-Nooh in the first round of the Players Championship Grand Final, Williams produced back-to-back comebacks from 1–3 down to knock out both Mark Selby and Matthew Selt 4–3. He then reached his first major ranking event final in over three years with a 4–2 win over Judd Trump and raced into a 3–0 lead against Joe Perry. However, his highest break in the next four frames was 14 as Perry fought back to triumph 4–3. In a rematch of the 2000 final, Williams played Matthew Stevens in the first round of the World Championship and was thrashed 10–2.

2015–16 season
Williams lost 1–5 to Judd Trump in the quarter-finals of the Shanghai Masters. He reached the final of the non-ranking General Cup, where he was defeated 3–7 by Marco Fu. He drew Ronnie O'Sullivan in the first round of the Masters and was 4–2 ahead. However, the match went to a deciding frame in which Williams missed a risky plant and lost 5–6. He lost in the fourth round of the Welsh Open 2–4 to Mark Selby and in the first round of three other ranking events and in qualifying for the China Open. Williams saw off Graeme Dott 10–4 and Michael Holt 13–8 to reach the quarter-finals of the World Championship for the first time in five years. However, he was then thrashed 3–13 by Ding Junhui in the quarter-final, with a session to spare.

2016–17 season
Williams won a trio of frames to force a decider in the semi-finals of the Riga Masters against Michael Holt, but missed the final brown to be defeated. He reached the quarter-finals of the Northern Ireland Open by beating John Higgins 4–1, then lost 4–5 to Kyren Wilson. He recorded another quarter-final at the UK Championship, but was downed 2–6 by Ronnie O'Sullivan. In the third round of the China Open, Williams came from 1–4 down to eliminate Higgins 5–4 and then thrashed Shaun Murphy 5–1. Another comfortable win followed as he saw off Hossein Vafaei 6–1 to play Mark Selby in the final. Williams needed to win to break back into the top 16 and avoid having to qualify for the World Championship. He was 8–7 up, but lost the last three frames to be beaten 8–10, falling short of winning his first ranking event for six years. He made it through to the final World Championship qualifying round, before Stuart Carrington beat him 10–7. Williams was noticeably absent from the cast of players at the Crucible's 40th anniversary, O'Sullivan suggesting that he was bitter about not qualifying for the championship.

2017–18 season
Williams won his first ranking title after a six-year drought, the Northern Ireland Open, defeating Chinese rising star Yan Bingtao 9–8 in the final; the victory was emotional for Williams, as he revealed that his wife had been suffering from ill health, and he had considered withdrawing from several tournaments. In the Masters, he faced Mark Selby in the first round, recovering from 3–5 behind to defeat the incumbent World Champion 6–5. He lost 1–6 to Kyren Wilson in the quarter-finals.

Having beaten Oliver Lines 5–1 and Matthew Stevens 5–3 to qualify for the 2018 German Masters, Williams lost the first two frames of his first-round match against Fergal O'Brien but went on to beat O'Brien 5–3, later overcoming Matthew Selt 5–2 and Jimmy Robertson 5–3 to reach the semi-finals. There, he recorded breaks of 109, 68 and 51 in defeating Judd Trump 6–1 to reach the final, where he would face Graeme Dott. In the final, Williams was dominant, making six breaks over 50 and one century, a 110 in the eighth frame. Dott won the third frame to trail 1–2, compiling a break of 64 after an earlier 56 by Williams, but did not win another, as Williams ran out a 9–1 victor.

Williams advanced to the semi-finals of the World Championship fairly comfortably, and before his match with Barry Hawkins in the semi-final said that he would do his press conference naked as the world champion if he won. Hawkins would prove to be Williams' most difficult opponent of the tournament: Williams levelled the match at 15–15 and secured the lengthy, hard-fought frames needed to win at the eleventh hour. Williams reached his first World Championship final since 2003 facing his fellow 'Class of '92' member, John Higgins. The match was described as one of the best finals in the history of the tournament, Williams winning 18–16 to claim his third World Championship making him (aged 43 at the time) the oldest winner since Reardon, who was 45 in 1978. (Ronnie O'Sullivan won his sixth world title in 2020, aged 44, meaning that Williams is now the third-oldest winner of a world title in the modern era.) It also marked 15 years since his last title, making it the largest time span between consecutive titles. Following victory, Williams thanked his late sponsor Ron Skinner, who had died two months earlier, his wife for convincing him not to retire, and coach Stephen Feeney for turning his game around so dramatically from a year ago. As promised, Williams appeared naked at his later press conference, much to the amusement of some news copywriters,
but was instructed to wear a towel.

2018–19 season
As world champion, Williams won the second event of the new season, the 2018 World Open. After recovering from 0–3 behind in his quarter-final against Jack Lisowski to win 5–3, he than came back from 2–5 down in his semi-final against Noppon Saengkham to win 6–5. In the final against David Gilbert, Williams again recovered from a sizeable deficit of 5–9 to win the match 10–9. At the 2019 World Championship, Williams' defence of his world title ended in the second round, with a 13–9 loss to Gilbert.

2019–20 season
Williams began the 2019–20 season positioned third in the world rankings. In early September, he reached the semi-finals of the Six-red World Championship, where he lost 5–7 to John Higgins. He later reached the final of the China Championship; having been 5–9 behind to Shaun Murphy, Williams won four frames to force a deciding frame, which he lost.

During the UK Championship, Williams commented on Twitter that he was not enjoying snooker, before losing 2–6 to Michael White in the second round. He decided not to travel to China to defend his World Open title, and also opted not to play in any of the Home Nations Series tournaments, but he still ended 2019 as world number two.

Playing style
Williams has been described by some snooker pundits as one of the greatest long potters in the game. He has compiled more than 500 competitive centuries during his professional career, and is 10th on the all-time list of century makers; this is despite his tendency to play exhibition shots, or to miss on purpose, when he knows that the frame is won. He is also well known for his ability to win "scrappy" frames, using his tactical play and by picking out .

An unusual aspect of Williams' playing style is a tendency to position his cue directly underneath his body instead of using the rest, a technique that he often brings into play once a frame is secure. He is partially colour blind and has difficulty distinguishing between the red and brown balls; on one occasion, he potted a brown ball believing it to be red.

Over the course of his career, Williams has earned the nicknames "Sprog", the "Welsh Potting Machine", and "The Welsh Wonder".

Personal life
Williams is also a keen poker player and golfer. He is proud of his Welsh heritage, and has a tattoo depicting the Welsh Dragon eating the English flag. He is a keen Manchester United supporter. Williams and his wife Joanne have three sons: Connor (born April 2004), Kian (born 2007) and Joel (born 2013). He is good friends with fellow snooker professionals Matthew Stevens, Jackson Page and Stephen Hendry, as well as boxer Joe Calzaghe. Williams was awarded an MBE in June 2004.

Performance and rankings timeline

Career finals

Ranking finals: 38 (24 titles)

Minor-ranking finals: 3 (2 titles)

Non-ranking finals: 22 (7 titles)

Pro-am finals: 8 (5 titles)

Team finals: 4 (2 titles)

Amateur finals: 1

References

External links

Mark Williams at worldsnooker.com
Profile on Global Snooker
Profile on WWW Snooker
Profile on BBC Wales 
YouTube: Mark Williams 147 at the 2005 World Championship
Profile on Yahoo! Sport

1975 births
Living people
Sportspeople from Ebbw Vale
Welsh snooker players
Masters (snooker) champions
Members of the Order of the British Empire
World number one snooker players
Welsh pool players
UK champions (snooker)
Winners of the professional snooker world championship